The Transcarpathian Art Institute (TAI) is an post-secondary academic institute. It was founded in 2003 and is located in Uzhhorod, Ukraine.

History

Background 

The TAI is among one of the few schools of art in Ukraine that trains specialists with higher education which helps address issues of economic stagnation and brain drain in the region.

Opening 
Competitions in the opening of higher art schools in Transcarpathia have a long history. Its start coincided with the opening of the Subcarpathian Rus, by two graduates of the Royal Hungarian Art Institute: Adalbert Erdeli (1891-1955) and Joseph Bokshay (1891-1975). Due to the lack of land for any specific art school, A.Erdeli settled in Mukachevo and became a teacher figure in the local civil school and teachers' seminary, where he worked for years (1916–1922). Joseph Bokshay, after returning from the Russian front in World War I, settled in 1919 as a teacher in Uzhgorod and did not change the place of work until 1945.

Their initial institution was a public school, which was founded in 1927, and the first art school in Transcarpathia was founded in March 1946. It was called the Uzhgorod State Arts and Crafts College, and was led by Adalbert Erdelyi Mikhailovich. In 1947, the director was John Harapko. Relay management institution of I.Harapka picked former students for Uzhgorod College, including Paul Balla (1958-1962), John Barnych (1962-1971), Joseph Pal (1971-1974), John Manaylo (1974-1980), John Kohutych, Boris Slivka (1985-1990), John Nebesnyk (1990-2003), Marina Kiyak (2003-2011), and Peter Petrysche (February 2011).

Residents 
Among the teachers at the offices that taught painting and woodcarving, many were outstanding artists - Joseph Bokshay, Theodore Manaylo, Andrew Kotska, Adalbert Boretsky, Ernest Kontratovych, John Harapko, Basil Svyda, William Berets, Sandor Petkov, Victor Demydyuk, and many other prominent artists all taught there.

College graduates were such well-known artists of the time, as Vladimir Nikita, George Hertz, John Shutyev Paul Bedzir, Edith and Nicholas Medvetsky Ivan Ilko, Ferenc Seman, Anton Shepa, Elizabeth Kremnytska. In December 1965, the institution was subordinated to the Ministry of Local Industry of the USSR called Uzhgorod College of Applied Arts. Supported and continued the tradition of the founders of the new generation of art education teachers, college graduates and the Art Institute of the Soviet Union - Lyudmila Averkiyeva, Attila Dunchak Joseph Pal, Ivan Manaylo Nicholas Medvetsky Paul Balla, Edita Medvetsky, John Masnyuk, Basil Petretskyy and others.
From 1998 to 2004, the college held dual stage ("junior specialist" - "Bachelor") training for integrated curricula.
Since the inception ZHI (2003) c. at. Rector appointed Nebesnyk Ivan Ivanovich - candidate of pedagogical sciences, professor, member of the Union of Artists, Honored Worker of Education of Ukraine, and Rector was invited to teaching leading artists and educators of Transcarpathia.

Campuses
"Main building" - the audience drawing, painting, and composition and font computer labs located in Uzhgorod on the street. Voloshin, 37 in the historic part of the city. Uzhanskyi zhupanatu was built on this site in the 18th century. This is evidenced by an entry baroque arch with the arms Uzhanskyi comitat and dating. Partially preserved building "A" institute of the same period, as indicated by the construction of basements and roof shape crowned by two akroteriyamy. Building "B" high school built in the 30 years of the 20th century. Bohemian style constructivism.

In the center of Mukachevo classrooms located in the "White House" Rakoczy family, which was built in the mid-17th century, as the residence of Transylvanian Princes. Originally it was a one-story building with signs of renaissance, which consisted of only five apartments. After the uprising of Ferenc II Rákóczi (1703–1711 years) departed family Shenbornov palace was rebuilt during the years 1746–1748. Restructuring by Valtasarom Neumann (1687-1753), known at the time Wurzburg architect. According to the draft to the old part of the right side of the building was added to the old building symmetrical wing.

Library, hostel, workshop, gym - in Uzhgorod on the street. Mynaiska 38/80.

For classes at the institution created 42 audiences, including 14 drawings classes and 10 workshops. The students are computer center which includes 6 computer labs that are connected to the Internet.

The museum, which holds the best degree of college graduates and the institution, which, however, plays a role methodical fund. Along with the establishment of an exposition methods Fund to present practical work on specialized subjects, and more than 100 samples of plaster casts, solids, outlets, antique portraits and figures, fragments of ancient architecture and decor, ekorshe and layouts from the original specializations.

The institute equipped training and production workshops according to their purpose:
Sculpture workshop, equipped with the appropriate machines, racks and illustrate;
Artistic ceramics workshop equipped with potter's wheel, molding machines, drying cabinets, electric roasting products and related illustrate;
Studio art wood features solid surface, thicknessing, fuhuvalnym drilling, kruhopylnym stalls.
Workshops with art metal include milling, drilling, turning, threading machines, Horn, nakovalnyamy and suitable instrument;
Graphic workshop with the proper equipment for easel graphics.

Institutes and faculties
The institute was formed with three chairs, two of which are releasing.

Department of Design 
was founded in 2004. Prepares educational qualification level "bachelor" and "specialist" in the following majors: graphic design, interior design environment. Has full-time and distance learning.
The department is headed by Ph.D., a member NUAU Sopko OI

The department developed relevant curricula and programs of professional disciplines and specialization. Subjects of diplomas is diverse, adaptable to the research department, with the implementation of the project and practical problems that are directly related majors, including project activity advertising and publishing products, basic editions book groups, brand and packaging-label products, interior design of residential and public buildings, design improvement and landscaping the parks, gardens and recreational parks.

Department of fine and decorative arts
was established in 2004.
The teaching staff of the department trains specialists educational qualification "Bachelor" and "specialist" in the following specializations: painting, art metal, art pottery, art wood. Has full-time and distance learning.
For teaching professional disciplines involved also experienced teachers. Most are members of the Union of Artists. The department is headed by Candidate of Sciences Voloshchuk A.

Students of the department are actively involved in various symposia, exhibitions and plein regional and nationwide level not only in Ukraine and Slovakia, Hungary and Poland. Ministry of Education, Youth and Sports of Ukraine holds annual National Olympiad in painting at the Transcarpathian Art Institute.
Department constantly communicates with art academies, colleges, schools, art schools in Ukraine.

Department of Education and Social Sciences
is zahalnoakademichnoyu. Objective - to provide for the students to all specialties classical humanitarian standards of the world and national culture; teach conscious ideological problem in the context of past and present, social and cultural life; educate ability to think independently, based on the achievements of the national and world classical culture. Head of the department Nebesnyk Ivan - Professor, Ph.D., a member of the Union of Artists, Honored Worker of Education of Ukraine.

It sets out, inter alia, the following disciplines: pedagogy and psychology, cultural studies, history of Ukraine; aesthetics; ethnopsychology, basic rights, basic economic theories, Ukrainian business language, philosophy, copyright, religious studies, sociology and political science, basic management and marketing methods of teaching spetsdystsyplin and others.
The department serves as the basis for the annual national conference on "Erdelivski reading", Proceedings of 2008 which produced Scientific Bulletin Transcarpathian Art Institute, where articles are published researchers in the field of pedagogy, design, art history and art education.

Honourable Doctors and famous alumni
Honorary doctorates universities are: 
Rector of the Lviv National Academy A. Bockotey, 
Hungarian professor and philanthropist P. Balázs.

References
Official site
Ukrainian Wikipedia

Universities in Ukraine
Uzhhorod
Art schools in Ukraine